Raymanovo (Rayman) is a rural locality (a village) in Sukkulovsky Selsoviet, Yermekeyevsky District, Bashkortostan, Russia. The population was 24 as of 2010. There is 1 street.

Geography 
Raymanovo is located 6 km south of Yermekeyevo (the district's administrative centre) by road.

References 

Rural localities in Yermekeyevsky District